is a former Japanese football player.

Club statistics
Updated to 23 February 2016.

References

External links

Profile at Kataller Toyama

1980 births
Living people
Kokushikan University alumni
Association football people from Hiroshima Prefecture
Japanese footballers
J2 League players
J3 League players
Japan Football League players
Kataller Toyama players
Association football midfielders